Anti-corporate activism is activism directed against the private sector, particularly larger corporations. It is premised on the belief that the activities and impacts of big business are detrimental to the public good and democratic process.

Disagreements with corporations
 
 
Activists argue that corporate globalization has displaced traditional industrial economies by emphasizing international trade and globalization, spurring financial deregulation. As more economies have embraced free-market approaches and deregulation, the power and autonomy of corporations has grown. Opponents of corporate globalization believe that governments need greater powers to control the market, limit or reduce corporate power, and eliminate rising income inequality. Usually on the political left, anti-corporate globalization activists rail against corporate power and advocate for reduced income gaps and improved economic equity.

Activists believe that large multinational corporations have too much influence, deploying contracted and employed lobbyists to advance their political and economic agendas around the world and increase corporate profits.

Counter-arguments

The defenders of corporations such as Ron Arnold highlight that governments do legislate in ways that restrict the actions of corporations (see Sarbanes-Oxley Act) and that lawbreaking companies and executives are routinely caught and punished, usually in the form of monetary fines. Governments, if democratically elected, may be the most legitimate mechanism by which to guide and control corporate activities.

In addition, from the perspective of business ethics it is argued that chief executives are not inherently more evil than anyone else and so are no more likely to attempt unethical or illegal activity than the general population.

Alliances
Anti-corporate activists often ally with other activists, such as environmental activists or animal-rights activists, in condemning the business practices of organizations such as the McDonald's Corporation (see McLibel) and forestry company Gunns Limited (see Gunns 20).

In recent years, the number of books (Naomi Klein's 2000 No Logo being a well-known example) and films on the subject has increased such as The Corporation which have to a certain extent supported anti-corporate politics.

Art activism
An artist critical of sociopolitical agendas in business is conceptualist Hans Haacke.

Anti-corporate web sites
In June 2008, Condé Nast Publications released an article entitled "The Secret Seven" which listed the top seven anti-corporate web sites. These included: WikiLeaks, Mini-Microsoft, Wal-Mart Watch, HomeOwners for Better Building, Brenda Priddy and Company (automotive spy photos) and finally Apple Rumor Sites AppleInsider and MacRumors.   In 2020, a group called "Save our Elders from Corporate Abuse" was formed on Facebook. The page was designed to report and expose banks, trust companies, brokerage firms, and other businesses that contractually obligate or otherwise trap senior citizens, particularly those over the age of 80, into predatory loans, perpetual billing for products, or other schemes intended to get money from them without their knowledge or consent.

New digital media

Media and digital networking have become important features of modern anti-corporate movements. The speed, flexibility, and ability to reach a massive potential audience has provided a technological foundation for a contemporary network social movement structure. As a result, communities and interpersonal connections have transformed - meaning that corporations can be challenged in novel ways. The internet supports and strengthens local ties, but also facilitates new patterns for political activity. Activists have used this medium to operate between both the online and offline political spectrum.

Email lists, web pages, and open editing software have allowed for changes within an organization. Social media allows activism to be coordinated and scaled in previously unimaginable ways. Now, actions are planned, information is shared, documents are produced by multiple people, and all of this can be done despite differences in distance. This has led to increased growth in digital collaboration. Activists can presently build ties between diverse topics, open the distribution of information, decentralize and increase collaboration, and self-direct networks.

Rise of anti-corporate globalization

Nearly fifty thousand people protested the WTO meetings in Seattle on November 30, 1999. Labor, economic, and environmental activists protesting corporate globalization disrupted and ended the meetings. Participants communicated their experiences and strategies through emails, websites, and other platforms. Their success electrified activists and anti-globalization networks grew stronger and new ones emerged. Anti-corporate globalization movements have successfully used social media to expand and organize mass mobilizations. In the United States, anti-corporate globalization movements reemerged after less attention was given to the war in Iraq, resulting in an increase in mass mobilizations.

See also
 Anti-consumerism
 Anti-globalization
 Bernie Sanders
 Jeremy Corbyn 
 Corporatocracy
 Evil corporation
 Lobbying in the United States
 McLibel case
 Multinational Monitor
 Occupy movement
 POCLAD – The Program On Corporations, Law, and Democracy
 Public Citizen
 Ralph Nader
 Criticisms of corporations

References

External links
Farewell to the End of History: Organization and Vision in Anti-Corporate Movements by Naomi Klein, Socialist Register, 2002

 
Corporate law
Corporate crime